Rudolf Pedersen (born 18 November 1934) is a Danish wrestler. He competed in the men's Greco-Roman featherweight at the 1960 Summer Olympics.

References

1934 births
Living people
Danish male sport wrestlers
Olympic wrestlers of Denmark
Wrestlers at the 1960 Summer Olympics
Sportspeople from Copenhagen